The Otaki-Maori Weight For Age Stakes is a group 1 flat horse race held at Otaki racecourse in New Zealand, racing under the name El Cheapo Cars WFA Classic.

History

The race is held annually in February and is run under weight for age (WFA) conditions.  It is now raced over a distance of 1600 metres, although in the past it was a 1400-metre event. 

Originally the race was run as a Listed race and eventually stepped up to Group 1 status in 1992.  

Past names for the race include the:
 Family Hotel WFA;
 Auto Auctions WFA;
 Terrace Regency Hotel WFA; 
 First Sovereign Trust Otaki-Maori WFA;
 Huanui Farm WFA Classic.

Past results

See also
  Recent winners of major NZ races
 Levin Classic
  Railway Stakes
 Telegraph Handicap
 Thorndon Mile
 Waikato Sprint
 Captain Cook Stakes

References

 N.Z. Thoroughbred Racing Inc.
 http://www.racenet.com.au
 http://www.nzracing.co.nz
 http://www.tab.co.nz
 http://www.racebase.co.nz
 New Zealand Thoroughbred Racing Annual 2018 (47th edition). Dennis Ryan, Editor, Racing Media NZ Limited, Auckland, New Zealand.
 New Zealand Thoroughbred Racing Annual 2017 (46th edition). Dennis Ryan, Editor, Racing Media NZ Limited, Auckland, New Zealand.
 New Zealand Thoroughbred Racing Annual 2008 (37th edition). Bradford, David, Editor.  Bradford Publishing Limited, Paeroa, New Zealand.
 New Zealand Thoroughbred Racing Annual 2005 (34th edition). Bradford, David, Editor.  Bradford Publishing Limited, Paeroa, New Zealand.
 New Zealand Thoroughbred Racing Annual 2004 (33rd edition). Bradford, David, Editor.  Bradford Publishing Limited, Paeroa, New Zealand.
 New Zealand Thoroughbred Racing Annual 2000 (29th edition). Bradford, David, Editor.  Bradford Publishing Limited, Auckland, New Zealand.
 New Zealand Thoroughbred Racing Annual 1997  (26th edition). Dillon, Mike, Editor. Mike Dillon's Racing Enterprises Ltd, Auckland, New Zealand.
 New Zealand Thoroughbred Racing Annual 1995 (24th edition). Dillon, Mike, Editor. Mike Dillon's Racing Enterprises Ltd, Auckland, New Zealand.
 New Zealand Thoroughbred Racing Annual 1994 (23rd edition). Dillon, Mike, Editor. Meadowset Publishing, Auckland, New Zealand.
 New Zealand Thoroughbred Racing Annual 1991  (20th edition). Dillon, Mike, Editor. Moa Publications, Auckland, New Zealand.
 New Zealand Thoroughbred Racing Annual 1987 (16th edition). Dillon, Mike, Editor. Moa Publications, Auckland, New Zealand.

Ōtaki, New Zealand
Horse races in New Zealand